The discography of Belgian rock band dEUS includes 7 studio albums, 2 compilation albums, 2 EPs, and 22 singles.

Albums

Studio albums

Compilation albums

EPs

Singles

Video albums

References

Discographies of Belgian artists
Rock music group discographies